Leucine-rich repeat-containing protein 23 is a protein that in humans is encoded by the LRRC23 gene.

Function 
The function of LRRC23 is unknown. It is a member of the leucine-rich repeat family of proteins, which are known for participating in protein-protein interactions. Experimental evidence suggests that LRRC23 interacts with the CD28 protein in a pathway related to the immune system and development of regulatory T cells that control spontaneous autoimmune disease.

Protein sequence
LRRC23 spans 343 residues containing two varieties of internally repeating sequence. Detected and aligned by RADAR, the most abundant repeat is the leucine-rich repeat, repeating 9 times in bases 89-287. The other repeated sequence occurs twice in bases 3-36. The RADAR program output, below, summarizes the composition and location of all the repeats and aligns them for comparison against each other.

The human genome produces three known variants of LRRC23. The largest splice variant, variant 3, contains 8 exons. Variants 1 and 2 use alternative first exons, and variant 2 excludes the seventh exon, giving it a total of seven exons making up the mRNA.

Protein structure
Although the actual structure of LRRC23 is unknown, comparison to the crystal structures of various similar proteins such as 2OMW A (e-value 1.00e-17) reveals a structure typical of other leucine-rich repeat proteins. Alternating beta sheets and coils create a spiraled peptide chain forming an arch shape with beta-sheets occupying the concave surface.

The aligned structure of 2OMW_A with LRRC23 spans acids 72-272 of the LRRC23 protein. Conserved asparagines are highlighted in yellow, showing the regularity of spacing and repeat structure within. This model was generated using Cn3D software provided by NCBI.

References

Further reading

External links 
 
 

LRR proteins